Boult Wade Tennant LLP is acknowledged as a leading European Intellectual Property firm.

The firm 
As of 2020, Boult Wade Tennant has 7 offices in 3 countries across Europe. The firm was founded and remains headquartered in London.  Boult Wade S.L. was established in 2018 and has an office in Madrid. A branch office of Boult Wade Tennant LLP opened in Berlin in 2019 and was followed later that year by a second opening in Germany in the city of Frankfurt.

The firm is recognised consistently in tier one in the UK by legal directories including: Chambers & Partners, Legal 500, Managing Intellectual Property, IAM Patent 1000 and WTR 1000. Many of its practitioners are recognised as leaders in their fields.

Since becoming a Limited Liability Partnership in April 2018, the firm has 22 designated members including Senior Partner, Nick McLeish and Managing Partner, Alex Frost.

Services 
Boult Wade Tennant’s teams work collaboratively across a wide range of disciplines and industry sectors. The services the firm offers include: IP prosecution, enforcing and defending rights, dispute resolution, strategy, due diligence and valuation, portfolio management  and brand management, brand selection, searching, watching and renewal services.

The firm’s attorneys advise multinational corporations, SMEs, governments, public sector and start-ups to ensure that inventions, brands and designs are protected. They are leading experts in acting in matters before the European Patent Office (EPO), the UKIPO (UK Intellectual Property Office) and EUIPO (European Union Intellectual Property Office).

The firm has five specialised practice areas: biotechnology and life sciences; chemical and materials; engineering and designs; high tech and electrical; and trade mark and domain names. These teams advise across a wide range of industries including: agriculture, automotive and aerospace, electronics and electrical, energy and environment, engineering and manufacturing, entertainment and media, fashion and cosmetics, food and beverage, medical devices, pharmaceuticals, transport and logistics and many cutting edge technologies.

History 
Boult Wade Tennant was founded by Alfred Julius Boult (1848–1932) in 1894. Boult was one of the founder members of the Royal Automobile Club, and after the removal of the old red-flag law, successfully completed the London to Brighton course. Boult became a partner in the firm of Messrs. W. P. Thompson and Boult of 63 Long-Row West Nottingham in 1881.

After taking over the debts and accounts of W. P. Thompson in 1894 Boult reconstituted the firm as Boult and Wade at 323 High Holborn London. Harold Wade was the Governor of University College School and was involved in the building of the first London cinema. Along with Boult, Wade was part of the institute of patent agents and procured patents and trade marks in all countries.

The firm changed their name to Messrs. Boult, Wade, and Kilburn in 1899 when Bertram Kilburn joined as a partner. Following the departure of Kilburn, who set up his own practice in 1906, Kilburn and Strode LLP; the firm again changed their name to the present form Boult, Wade, Tennant with the addition of William John Tennant (1866–1951). Before joining Boult, Wade, and Tennant, Tennant was part of a firm of consulting civil engineers. Tennant's expertise in the patent world mainly focused on automobile patents, an innovative industry at the time in which both Boult and Wade were heavily invested in; Tennant became a Member of the Institution of Automobile Engineers and rose to vice-president in 1930. It was at this time that the premises moved to 111-112 Hatton Gardens, London.

Notable cases 
In 1895, Boult and Wade researched and cased a watermarking improvement as a novel invention by inventor W. K. Trotman. The patent was worth £20,000 in cash and £30,000 in fully paid up ordinary shares of £1.00 each an extraordinary sum for the time.

In 1896 Boult and Wade aided in the patency of tyres for the automobile industry by the Dunlop Pneumatic Tyre Company. John Boyd Dunlop, being the inventor of the first pneumatic tyre In 1888, discovering the pneumatic tyre principle and revolutionising the automotive industry.

in 1898 Boult and Wade patented an improvement in needles for the manufacture of felted fabrics.

In 1913, Boult, Wade and Tennant performed a search of patents to similar patents to the invention by Mr Lamplough, a way of cracking oil during the process of motor spirit production. The Lamplough is now one of the chief processes for the efficient commercial production of motor spirit from creosote and shale.

In 1926, Boult, Wade and Tennant worked with John Logie Baird in acquiring patents to commercially develop the Baird Television. The firm created covering letters, patents, and protection for the Baird System of television to enable vision of living and moving beings... to be transmitted by wireless and land wire. In a report received from Messrs Boult, Wade and Tennant, they stated:

"We have the pleasure in certifying that twenty-nine patents and applications for patents have been filed in this country in connection with the Baird System of television."

In 1954, Boult, Wade and Tennant corresponded with the Universal Brewery Equipment Ltd in their design of metal containers used for storing, transporting, and dispensing beer. This consisted of specification and technical drawings.

References

External links 
 Boult Wade Tennant Website

Law firms established in 1894
Intellectual property law firms
Law firms of the United Kingdom
Patent law firms